Dorcadion brauni is a species of beetle in the family Cerambycidae. It was described by Breuning in 1979.

References

brauni
Beetles described in 1979